The Meteor was a named passenger train operated by the  St. Louis-San Francisco Railway (a.k.a. SLSF or "the Frisco").  It ran overnight between Oklahoma City and St. Louis via Tulsa and was later extended to Lawton, Oklahoma on July 18, 1955.  The name was shared with a branch line Meteor running between Monett, Missouri, and Paris, Texas. Later this line was truncated to terminate at Fort Smith, Arkansas.

The Meteor was inaugurated between St. Louis and Tulsa in 1902. One engineer who joined the Frisco in 1917 recalled that the Meteor was already a well-known train at that time.  Initially the trains were pulled by Frisco-class 1300 locomotives, being high-wheeled Baldwin engines with 2-8-0 wheel arrangements.  During the late 1930s and into the early years of World War II, Frisco-class 1500 Baldwin engines with 4-8-2 wheel arrangements took over the job.

Frisco-class 4500 locomotives, and specifically locomotives No. 4500, 4501 and 4502, being three of twenty-five Northern class Baldwin 4-8-4s built for Frisco during World War II, were later designated for use on the Meteor.  These locomotives were delivered in a distinctive zephyr blue, white and gray paint scheme with "Meteor" spelled out across the tender in bold red lettering. These three passenger engines also saw service pulling the Texas Special. In 1948, Frisco 4501 still in its Meteor livery pulled President Harry S. Truman's whistle stop tour train through his home state of Missouri.

When the Meteor was converted to use diesel locomotives, No. 4500 was re-painted into Frisco's standard black with gold striping and lettering and assigned to passenger trains such as the Will Rogers.  The cosmetically-restored No. 4500, back in its Meteor paint scheme, now resides at the Route 66 Historical Village at 3770 Southwest Blvd. in Tulsa, Oklahoma.  Engine No. 4501, also in the Meteor paint scheme, resides at the Museum of the American Railroad, in Frisco, Texas. 
 
The streamlined, diesel equipped Meteor began westbound operations on May 14, 1948, with its first eastbound train departing Oklahoma City on May 15.  At the end of its maiden trip the president of the Frisco, while giving an interview in his private railcar attached to the train, pointed to a glass filled nearly to the brim with water. "Not a drop spilled between St. Louis and Tulsa," he said proudly.  Frisco purchased the EMD E7 locomotives and Pullman cars for the Meteor at the same time as they purchased ones for the Texas Special, so the two trains shared a distinctive look; bright red with corrugated aluminum side panels. Frisco bought sets of named cars for each train.

The last day of Meteor service was September 17, 1965. While its itinerary was on an overnight schedule, it was followed by a day train on the same route, the Oklahoman.

Named cars
Named trains frequently had named cars; the Frisco named Meteor cars after cities and rivers.  Not all cars may have been named, but the ones that were bore their names prominently on their side panels.

Models of the Meteor 
Hallmark Models, Inc., a model train manufacturer has produced brass E7 diesels and corrugated passenger cars in red and silver without lettering, so that modelers can customize them for either a Meteor or Texas Special train.

References

External links 

 1948 timetable

Passenger trains of the St. Louis–San Francisco Railway
Named passenger trains of the United States
Night trains of the United States
Passenger rail transportation in Missouri
Passenger rail transportation in Oklahoma